Andy Comeau (born October 19, 1970) is an American actor. He is best known for playing Theodore "Teddy" Huffstodt on the Showtime series Huff (2004-2006). He was also featured in the fourth season of the series House as Dr. Travis Brennan in 2007.

Life and career
Comeau's resemblance to Tom Hanks helped him gain the role of Forrest Gump in the 1996 music video for the "Weird Al" Yankovic song "Gump". Shortly after his breakthrough with "Gump", Comeau appeared as Charlie in 8 Heads in a Duffel Bag (1997) alongside Joe Pesci, David Spade and Kristy Swanson. The following year he played Tim Connors in Blackout Effect (1998) and Tom Inman in Virtual Obsession (1998).

In 1999, he appeared in the fourth episode of the second season of Will and Grace as Andy Fellner, Grace's childhood friend whom Grace's mom fixes up with Will. Back on the silver screen, Comeau had a brief but pivotal role in the Robin Williams thriller One Hour Photo (2002).

He also guest-starred in Criminal Minds in the season 1 episode "Charm and Harm" where he played a serial killer named Mark Gregory who abducted random women before holding them prisoner for several days while also subjecting them to torture and then drowning them.

In 2004 the actor came back to cinema with My Tiny Universe (2004), a dark comedy.

Comeau portrayed Teddy Huffstodt, the mentally unbalanced brother of Hank Azaria's Dr. Craig Huffstodt, for the duration of the series Huff (2004-2006) until the series was cancelled due to low ratings.

Not long after that program's conclusion, he appeared in several 2007 episodes of House. His character, Dr. Travis Brennan, was an epidemiologist who was one of several doctors vying to work under Hugh Laurie's protagonist, Gregory House. In 2010, Comeau portrayed a plastic surgery patient in the final season of Nip/Tuck and appeared in a Progressive Auto Insurance advertisement.

Comeau's theater credits include The Cherry Orchard, Biloxi Blues, The Tempest and A Midsummer Night’s Dream.

He is the bandleader and saxophonist for the Los Angeles-based band Vaud and the Villains, a 19-piece New Orleans 1930s themed musical act with dancers and spoken word artists. His stage name with the group is Vaud Overstreet.

References

External links

1970 births
Living people
Male actors from New Hampshire
American male film actors
American male stage actors
American male television actors
20th-century American male actors
21st-century American male actors
People from New Boston, New Hampshire